Flagship is an independent magazine for gamers that was published from 1983 to 2010. Published bimonthly in the UK, it started in 1983 for play-by-mail game (PBM) players. The magazine also had a United States edition. In 2002, it expanded coverage to encompass other types of games such as boardgames, card games, computer games, and others. Nicky Palmer was the founding editor, with Carol Mulholland assuming editorial duties as of issue No. 70. The magazine ceased publication in 2010 after issue No. 130.

History  
Flagship began publication in the United Kingdom in October 1983, the month before Gaming Universal's first issue was published in the United States. The editor for the initial Winter 1983 issue was Nick Palmer. Flagship was edited by Carol Mulholland from issue 70. Shortly after publishing issue 130 in 2010 Carol Mulholland suffered a serious illness and the magazine ceased publication.

Coverage
An average issue in 1987 was about 56 pages. The magazine came out bimonthly with game reviews, diaries, news columns and an emphasis on reader feedback. AT Jeux published a French version of Flagship. Flagship also had a U.S. edition. By early 1994 the U.S. edition editor had changed from Bob Bost to Joey Browning.

In 2002 it extended its coverage to include boardgames, role-playing games, web games and massively multiplayer online games, along with collectible card games and computer games.

Reception
David Webber, the editor in chief of Paper Mayhem, a US-based play-by-mail gaming magazine, stated in 1987 that Flagship was "a highly professional PBM magazine", noting that the published material was "very informative and each issue usually cover[ed] several current PBM games from the UK and the US". Webber asserted that Flagship was "a must for the PBM gamer", observing that the content and reliability of the magazine were very good, and recommending it to his own readers.

John Woods commented on Flagship in The Games Machine in its August 1989 issue. Flagship is the most professional looking magazine for the hobby. It’s usually around 60 A4 pages and is a very well-written read. The reviews are always very comprehensive, but the news often suffers from being out of date, and there’s also a fair amount of coverage of US games. Also the reviews of new games generally take a long time to appear. It’s perhaps a little pricey at £2.25 an issue (£8 a year) but well worth it considering the depth of coverage.

See also
 Gaming Universal Magazine (Play-by-mail magazine)
 List of play-by-mail games
 The Nuts & Bolts of PBM (Play-by-mail magazine)
 Paper Mayhem Magazine (Play-by-mail magazine)
 Play-by-mail game

References

Further reading
 
 

Bi-monthly magazines published in the United Kingdom
Defunct magazines published in the United Kingdom
Game magazines published in the United Kingdom
Magazines established in 1983
Magazines disestablished in 2010
Play-by-mail magazines
Mass media in Exeter